The Lyttelton Range is a narrow northwest-trending mountain range located south of Dunedin Range in the Admiralty Mountains of Antarctica. The range is 26 km (16 mi) long and forms the western wall of the upper part of the Dennistoun Glacier.

Mapped by USGS from surveys and U.S. Navy air photos, 1960-63. Named by US-ACAN after the port of Lyttelton, New Zealand, where over the years, many expedition ships refueled and replenished supplies en route to Antarctica; also in recognition of the friendship and cooperation of its citizens with American participation in the U.S. Antarctic Research Program.

References

Mountain ranges of the Ross Dependency
Admiralty Mountains